Alaunus or Alaunius (Gaulish: Alaunos) is a Gaulish god of healing and prophecy. His name is known from inscriptions found in Lurs, Alpes-de-Haute-Provence in Southern France and in Mannheim in western Germany. In the latter inscription, Alaunus is used as an epithet of Mercury. The feminine form Alauna (from an earlier *Alamnā) is at the origin of many place-names and hydronyms across Europe, including the Roman-era names of Valognes in Normandy, Maryport and Watercrook in Cumbria, Alcester in Warwickshire, Ardoch in Perthshire, and Learchild and the River Aln in Northumberland.

Name 
The Gaulish theonym Alaunos stems from a Proto-Celtic form reconstructed as *Alamnos. The etymology remains uncertain. It has been traditionally derived from the root *al- ('feed, raise, nurture'), and compared with the Latin alumnus ('nursling') and with names of rivers such as Almus in Moesia, Yealm (*Almii) in England, or Alme in Westphalia. *Alamnos could thus  be translated as 'the Nourishing One'.

A Gallic tribe named Alauni (Αλαυνοί) is also attested in Noricum, and linguist Xavier Delamarre has argued that the root alǝ-, meaning 'to wander', "would suit river names as much as ethnic ones". In this view, *Alamnos may be compared with the Celtic stem *alamo- ('herd'; cf. Old Irish alam, Welsh alaf), and the ethnonym Alauni rendered as the 'errants' or the 'nomads', contrasting with the name of the Anauni ('the Staying Ones').

See also
Alauna (disambiguation)
List of solar deities

References

Bibliography

Further reading
Ellis, Peter Berresford, Dictionary of Celtic Mythology(Oxford Paperback Reference), Oxford University Press, (1994): 
Wood, Juliette, The Celts: Life, Myth, and Art, Thorsons Publishers (2002):

External links

Proto-Celtic — English lexicon

Gaulish gods
Health gods
Oracular gods
Solar gods